Helen Herring Stephens (February 3, 1918 – January 17, 1994) was an American athlete and a double Olympic champion in 1936.

Biography
Stephens, nicknamed the "Fulton Flash" after her birthplace, Fulton, Missouri, was a strong athlete in sprint events—she never lost a race in her entire career—and also in weight events such as the shot put and discus throw. She won national titles in both categories.

When she was 18, Stephens participated in the 1936 Summer Olympics. There she won the 100 m final, beating reigning champion and world record holder, Stanisława Walasiewicz (aka Stella Walsh) of Poland. Stephen's time of 11.5 s was below the world record, but was not recognized because a strong tailwind was blowing at the time of the race. Next, Stephens anchored the American 4 × 100 m relay team that won the Olympic title after the leading German team dropped its baton.

Stephens is quoted by Olympic historian, David Wallechinsky, about her post-race experience with Adolf Hitler. "He comes in and gives me the Nazi salute. I gave him a good, old-fashioned Missouri handshake," she said. "Once more Hitler goes for the jugular vein. He gets hold of my fanny and begins to squeeze and pinch, and hug me up. And he said: 'You're a true Aryan type. You should be running for Germany.' So after he gave me the once over and a full massage, he asked me if I'd like to spend the weekend in Berchtesgaden." Stephens refused.

Stephens retired from athletics shortly after the games and played professional baseball and softball. She attended William Woods University, Fulton High School, and Middle River School in Fulton. From 1938 to 1952, she was the owner and manager of her own semi-professional basketball team; she was the first woman to own and manage a semi-professional basketball team. She was employed for many years in the Research Division of the U.S. Aeronautical Chart and Information Service (later, a part of the Defense Mapping Agency) in St. Louis, Missouri.

Her longtime partner was Mabel O. Robbe (née Wires), a dietician at Francis Shimer College.

In 1993, she was inducted into the National Women's Hall of Fame.

She died in Saint Louis at age 75.

Gender
At the 1936 Olympics, it was suggested that both Stephens and Stanisława Walasiewicz were, in fact, male. The International Olympic Committee performed a physical check on Stephens and concluded that she was a woman.

Bibliography 
 The Life of Helen Stephens – The Fulton Flash, by Sharon Kinney Hanson,  2004.

References

External links 
 
 
 
 

1918 births
1994 deaths
American female discus throwers
American female shot putters
American female sprinters
American women's basketball players
American female baseball players
Olympic gold medalists for the United States in track and field
Athletes (track and field) at the 1936 Summer Olympics
Medalists at the 1936 Summer Olympics
William Woods University alumni
People from Fulton, Missouri
Softball players from Missouri
Track and field athletes from Missouri
USA Outdoor Track and Field Championships winners
USA Indoor Track and Field Championships winners
20th-century American women
20th-century American people
LGBT people from Missouri
LGBT track and field athletes
American LGBT sportspeople
Olympic female sprinters
20th-century American LGBT people